Sir David Eric Fairbairn,  (3 March 1917 – 1 June 1994) was an Australian politician. He was a member of the Liberal Party and served in the House of Representatives from 1949 to 1975. He held ministerial office as Minister for Air (1962–1964), National Development (1964–1969), Education and Science (1971), and Defence (1971–1972).

Early life
Fairbairn was born in Claygate, Surrey. His grandfathers both served in the Parliament of Australia—Sir George Fairbairn served in the House of Representatives seat of Fawkner from 1906 to 1913 and in the Senate from 1917 to 1923, and Edmund Jowett was the federal member for Grampians from 1917 to 1922. His uncle, James Fairbairn, was one of three ministers in the Menzies government who were killed in the 1940 Canberra air disaster.

Fairbairn was educated at Geelong Grammar School  and Jesus College, Cambridge. In 1939, he took control of Dunraven, a pastoral property at Woomargama, Riverina, New South Wales.

World War II
During World War II, he served in the 21st Light Horse Riverina Regiment from 1939 to 1941 and joined the Royal Australian Air Force in 1941. He served both in Britain, where he located the first V-1 flying bomb launching site, and in the New Guinea campaign. In 1945 he was badly wounded and discharged with the rank of Flight Lieutenant. Fairbairn had been awarded the Distinguished Flying Cross in 1944.

Political career

In the 1949 election, Fairbairn was elected to the House of Representatives as the federal member for Farrer. He was appointed Minister for the Air in 1962 in the ninth Menzies Ministry.  In 1964, he became Minister for National Development.  After the 1969 election, he unsuccessfully challenged Prime Minister John Gorton for the leadership (along with William McMahon), and then resigned from the ministry, saying: "I have given deep thought and consideration to this decision. I have made it reluctantly. My sole concern in coming to it is the future of the Liberal Party, the Government and the Nation."  According to Ian Sinclair, he was opposed to Gorton's centralism and in particular, his attempt to claim of sovereignty over Australia's territorial waters and continental shelf for the Commonwealth.

Fairbairn became Minister for Education and Science in March 1971 in the McMahon Ministry and Minister for Defence from August 1971 to the government's defeat in 1972 election. He retired from Parliament at the 1975 election.

From 1977 to 1980, Fairbairn was Australia's Ambassador to the Netherlands. Media reported that the posting "deeply perturbed" staff of the Department of Foreign Affairs, which came at a time when the department was being forced to reduce its overseas representation significantly.

Fairbairn died in Woden Valley Hospital in Canberra on 1 June 1994, survived by his wife, Ruth and three daughters.

Honours
Fairbairn was awarded a Distinguished Flying Cross in 1944, and made a Knight Commander of the Order of the British Empire in 1977.

Notes

 

Liberal Party of Australia members of the Parliament of Australia
Members of the Australian House of Representatives for Farrer
Members of the Australian House of Representatives
Leaders of the Australian House of Representatives
1917 births
1994 deaths
Australian Knights Commander of the Order of the British Empire
Australian politicians awarded knighthoods
Australian Army personnel of World War II
Australian recipients of the Distinguished Flying Cross (United Kingdom)
Members of the Cabinet of Australia
Alumni of Jesus College, Cambridge
Ambassadors of Australia to the Netherlands
Defence ministers of Australia
20th-century Australian politicians
People educated at Geelong Grammar School
Royal Australian Air Force personnel of World War II
Royal Australian Air Force officers